= Le Petit Chef =

Logo

Le Petit Chef is an immersive dining experience. It features an animated chef. Many cities have hosted the concept, including:

- Dallas
- Hong Kong
- Johannesburg
- Phoenix, Arizona
- Portland, Oregon
- Sacramento
- San Diego
- Santa Clara
- Seattle
- St. Louis
- Tokyo
- Vancouver
